White hellebore or white false hellebore is a common name for several plants and may refer to:

 Veratrum album, native to Europe and western Asia
 Veratrum californicum, native to North America
 Veratrum viride, native to North America